Boron sulfide is the chemical compound with the formula B2S3.  This polymeric material that has been of interest as a component of "high-tech" glasses and as a reagent for preparing organosulfur compounds.  Like the sulfides of silicon and phosphorus, B2S3 reacts with water, including atmospheric moisture to release H2S.  Thus, samples must be handled under anhydrous conditions.

Like the boron oxides, B2S3 readily forms glasses when blended with other sulfides such as P4S10.  Such glasses absorb lower frequencies of Infra-red energy relative to conventional borosilicate glasses.

B2S3 converts ketones into the corresponding thiones.  For example, the conversion of benzophenone to its thione proceeds as follows:

 + 3  →  + 3 

In practice, B2S3 would be used in excess.

Synthesis
Among other methods Diboron Trisulfide can be obtained by the reaction of iron or manganese boride with hydrogen sulfide at temperatures of 300 °C.
2 FeB  +  4 H2S  →  B2S3  +  FeS + 4 H2

The first synthesis was done by Jöns Jakob Berzelius in 1824 by direct reaction of amorphous boron with sulfur vapor.
2 B  +  3 S  →  B2S3

Another synthesis was favoured by Friedrich Wöhler and Henri Etienne Sainte-Claire Deville first published in 1858, starting from boron and  hydrogen sulfide.

2 B  +  3 H2S  →  B2S3  +  3 H2

Structure
The boron atoms in B2S3 are trigonal planar, and are arranged in B3S3 and B2S2 rings with bridging S atoms forming a layer structure with an interlayer distance of 355 pm. This is different from boron trioxide which has a three dimensional structure.

The molecular, monomeric, form of B2S3 has a planar V shape with the central B-S-B angle of approximately 120°.

References

Boron compounds
Sulfides